The Canton of Aubigny-en-Artois is a former canton situated in the department of the Pas-de-Calais and in the Nord-Pas-de-Calais region of northern France. It was disbanded following the French canton reorganisation which came into effect in March 2015. It had a total of 12,650 inhabitants (2012, without double counting).

Geography 
The canton was organised around Aubigny-en-Artois in the arrondissement of Arras. The altitude varied from 70m (La Comté) to 193m (La Comté) for an average altitude of 127m.

The canton comprised 30 communes:

Agnières
Ambrines
Aubigny-en-Artois
Averdoingt
Bailleul-aux-Cornailles
Bajus
Berles-Monchel
Béthonsart
Cambligneul
Camblain-l'Abbé
Capelle-Fermont
Chelers
La Comté
Frévillers
Frévin-Capelle
Gouy-en-Ternois
Hermaville
Izel-lès-Hameau
Magnicourt-en-Comte
Maizières
Mingoval
Monchy-Breton
Penin
Savy-Berlette
La Thieuloye
Tilloy-lès-Hermaville
Tincques
Villers-Brûlin
Villers-Châtel
Villers-Sir-Simon

Population

See also
Cantons of Pas-de-Calais
Communes of Pas-de-Calais
Arrondissements of the Pas-de-Calais department

References

Aubigny-en-Artois
2015 disestablishments in France
States and territories disestablished in 2015